Hybomitra cyanops  is a species of horse flies belonging to the family Tabanidae. It is a Palearctic species.

Distribution
Syria.

References

Tabanidae
Diptera of Asia
Insects described in 1880
Taxa named by Friedrich Moritz Brauer